Leon Knap (born 1 May 1911, he died in 1986) was a Slovenian cross-country skier. He competed in the men's 18 kilometre event at the 1936 Winter Olympics.

References

1911 births
Year of death missing
Slovenian male cross-country skiers
Olympic cross-country skiers of Yugoslavia
Cross-country skiers at the 1936 Winter Olympics
People from Kranjska Gora